Squire is the second solo album by Alan Hull. Recorded at Morgan Studios December 1974 & January 1975 except "Waiting" which was recorded at Trident Studios with Roy Baker in March 1973. Squire was released on Warner Brothers, K56121, in 1975. Information taken from the cover of the album, bought on release in 1975.

Track listing

Side One 
 "Squire" - 5:07
 "Dan The Plan" - 4:09
 "Picture (A Little Girl)" - 2:53
 "Nuthin' Shakin' (But the Leaves on the Trees)" - 3:42
 "One More Bottle of Wine" - 4:10

Side Two 
 "Golden Oldies" - 3:47
 "I'm Sorry Squire" - 3:56
 "Waiting" - 3:40
 "Bad Side of Town" - 3:53
 "Mr. " - 2:30
 "The End" 0:38

All songs written by Alan Hull (©Hazy Music); except "Nuthin' Shakin'" (Eddie Fontaine, Cirino Colacrai, Diane Lampert, John Gluck, Jr., ©Jewel Music)

Personnel 
Alan Hull - electric & acoustic guitar, percussion, Mellotron, recorders, piano, lead & backing vocals
Kenny Craddock - electric, acoustic, catgut & 12-string guitar, percussion, vibes, organ, electric & acoustic piano, Mellotron, Mini-Korg, whistling
Colin Gibson - bass guitar, percussion
Ray Laidlaw - drums
Ray Jackson - harp, mandolin, flatulette
Terry Popple - drums
Micky Moody - electric guitar
Brian Chatton - piano
Albert Lee - electric guitar
Jean Roussel - organ
Jo Newman - backing vocals
Lesley Duncan - backing vocals
Orchestra arranged & conducted by Jean Roussel
Engineered by Mike Bobak
Produced by Alan Hull
Cut by George Peckham

Alan Hull albums
1975 albums
Warner Records albums
albums recorded at Morgan Sound Studios